Rhamphochromis lucius is a species of piscivorous cichlid endemic to Lake Malawi where it prefers deep, open waters.  This species can reach a length of  TL.  It can also be found in the aquarium trade. FishBase treats this species as a valid species, although note that it may be a synonym of Rhamphochromis woodi but the Catalog of Fishes treats it as a synonym of Rhamphochromis esox, as does the IUCN.

References

lucius
Taxa named by Ernst Ahl
Fish described in 1926
Taxonomy articles created by Polbot
Taxobox binomials not recognized by IUCN